The 2002 LPGA Tour was the 53rd season since the LPGA Tour officially began in 1950. The season ran from February 28 to November 24. The season consisted of 32 official money events. Annika Sörenstam won the most tournaments, 11. She also led the money list with earnings of $2,863,904.

The season saw the first tournament with a $3,000,000 purse, the U.S. Women's Open. There were three first-time winners in 2002: Laura Diaz, Cristie Kerr, and Patricia Meunier-Lebouc.

The tournament results, leaders, and award winners are listed below.

Tournament results
The following table shows all the official money events for the 2002 season. "Date" is the ending date of the tournament. The numbers in parentheses after the winners' names are the number of wins they had on the tour up to and including that event. Majors are shown in bold.

^ – weather-shortened tournament

Leaders
Money List leaders

Full 2002 Official Money List

Awards

References

External links
LPGA Tour official site
2002 season coverage at golfobserver.com

LPGA Tour seasons
LPGA Tour